Rodrigo Lacerda Ramos (born 6 October 1980), also known as Ferrugem in Brazil, is a Brazilian former professional footballer who played as a midfielder.

Club career
Rodrigo was born in São Bernardo do Campo, Brazil. His previous clubs include Palmeiras, AEK Athens, Atlético Mineiro, AC Ajaccio and RC Strasbourg. On 17 July 2009, Rodrigo has returned to Strasbourg after two years, signing from Japanese side Júbilo Iwata on a two-year deal.

International career
Rodrigo captained the U-20 Brazil national team at the 1999 FIFA World Youth Championship in Nigeria.

Honours 
Sion
Swiss Cup: 2010–11

References

External links
 
 
 

1980 births
Living people
People from São Bernardo do Campo
Association football midfielders
Brazilian footballers
Brazil under-20 international footballers
AEK Athens F.C. players
Super League Greece players
Clube Atlético Mineiro players
Sociedade Esportiva Palmeiras players
Criciúma Esporte Clube players
AC Ajaccio players
RC Strasbourg Alsace players
Ligue 1 players
Júbilo Iwata players
J1 League players
FC Sion players
FC Lausanne-Sport players
Swiss Super League players
Brazilian expatriate footballers
Brazilian expatriate sportspeople in Greece
Expatriate footballers in Greece
Brazilian expatriate sportspeople in France
Expatriate footballers in France
Brazilian expatriate sportspeople in Japan
Expatriate footballers in Japan
Brazilian expatriate sportspeople in Switzerland
Expatriate footballers in Switzerland
Footballers from São Paulo (state)